Juan Navarro Early College High School (formerly Sidney Lanier High School) was established in 1961 as the sixth high school in the Austin Independent School District (AISD) and was originally located in the building which today houses Burnet Middle School. Lanier was named in honor of the famous southern poet Sidney Lanier. The AISD Board of Trustees voted on March 24, 2019, to rename the school Juan Navarro High School. Juan Navarro was a 2007 graduate who died in Afghanistan from an improvised explosive device in July 2012. The current campus, opened in 1966, is located on Payton Gin Road. In 1997, Lanier was nationally recognized as a Blue Ribbon School, the highest honor a school could receive at the time. When it first opened, Lanier had virtually an all White student base with a highly active FFA chapter, but over the years it has become a primarily Mexican-American school with over 85% of its students being Hispanic.

Notable alumni
 Tommy Boggs, 1st round draft pick and Major League Baseball pitcher
 Albert Burditt, professional basketball player
 Derrick Strait, professional football player
 Ken Harvey, Four-time NFL Pro Bowl football player
 James T. Harris, 1983 University of Texas Baseball National Champions, Doctor of Physical Therapy, AMTA, OCS, FAAOMPT, 5th Grade Patrol Service Captain
SMV Tone Professional artist, Entrepreneur, philanthropist

References

External links

 Navarro ECHS Website

High schools in Austin, Texas
Austin Independent School District high schools
Educational institutions established in 1961
1961 establishments in Texas